The Kölnbrein Dam is an arch dam in the Hohe Tauern range within Carinthia, Austria. The dam's reservoir serves as the primary storage in a three-stage pumped-storage power system that consists of nine dams, four hydroelectric power plants and a series of pipeline and penstocks. The complex is owned by Verbund power company and is referred to as the Malta-Reisseck Power Plant Group.

While the dam's reservoir was filling, several cracks appeared in the dam and it took more than a decade of repairs before the reservoir could operate at maximum levels. Currently, the Reisseck II pumped-storage power plant is under construction and will effectively connect both the Malta and Reisseck groups and add an additional 430 MW of production capacity.

Construction

Plans for the dam were already drafted in the late 1930s by the German AEG engineering company, when the Kaprun power plant was built north of the Alpine divide. The project was resumed by the Austrian authorities after World War II with extended exploratory drilling from 1957 onwards, nevertheless the construction of the Kölnbrein Dam did not begin until 1971.

Before cement and other construction materials could be moved on site, an access road had to be constructed. This proved difficult as the steep Malta Valley rises over  along a  stretch and at times has 13 percent gradients. To complete the road, six tunnels were excavated. In 1973, as superstructure construction progressed, cement was transported on site and mixed with aggregate from local sources. To reduce thermal expansion, concrete was poured  at a time and pipes with circulating water were placed throughout the mass. The structure consisted of 30 columns with each joint grouted.

Completion and cracks
By 1977, construction on the dam had reached an advanced stage where it could begin to impound its reservoir. Uplift pressure on the dam had unexpectedly increased as well and engineers worried that the structure's grout curtain had been damaged. Because the dam is in a "U"-shaped valley instead of the usual "V"-shaped for arch dams, hydrostatic pressure is exceptionally strong on the center-bottom (heel) upstream portion of the dam. As excessive water leaked into lower areas of the dam, the water level was drawn down and engineers increased drainage. 

In 1979, the grout curtain was strengthened and another full impoundment was unsuccessfully attempted. Between 1980 and 1981, a polyurethane resin grout was used to re-grout joints and they were frozen during the next impoundment attempt, allowing them to thaw naturally. As remedial works progressed, cracks near the abutments (flanks) of the dam formed as well; on the downstream side and in a horizontal direction. A plastic sheet-covered concrete blanket was laid on the upstream valley floor behind the dam between 1981 and 1983. In the next few years, the sheets had to be repaired and the grout curtain re-grouted. In 1984, the reservoir was able to reach 90 percent full. In 1979 and 1983, it had temporarily reached its maximum level as well but it could not be safely sustained.

Notwithstanding these remedial actions, a long-term solution was required. Its construction was approved in 1988 and executed between 1989 and 1992. Joining the dam and the block are over 600 special neoprene pads which adjust to forces from the reservoir rising and lowering. In addition, joints and fissures in the dam were re-grouted again but with a water-tight resin epoxy. The reservoir was able to operate at maximum levels and operate as normal in 1993.

Design and operation

The water in the reservoir is used to generate electricity. It is drawn down as electric load demands. Because the catchment area around the dam can only supply half the needed water to sustain its reservoir levels, a series pumps and pumped-storage power plants are utilized to supplement storage capacity. These pumps operate during periods of low power demand, filling the reservoir. When demand is high, water is released back into the system to produce hydroelectricity.

Immediately downstream from the Kölnbrein Dam is the Galgenbichl dam and reservoir. This reservoir serves to receive water from several different locations in Malta via pipeline and is the lower reservoir for the Upper stage pumped-storage power station. From the northeast, water is pumped in from several smaller reservoirs and tributaries.

Reisseck-Kreuzeck power plants
The water collected above in the Reisseck mountains runs downhill towards the valley of the Möll River. Water is principally received from sources and Kreuzeck mountains to the south though. 
Of the power plant group, the Reisseck-Kreuzeck plants were constructed between 1948 and 1961 and the Malta group from 1971 to 1979.

On the south side of the Möll River, water is used to generate power at the Niklai power station near Sachsenburg. From there, the water is then received at the Rosswiese reservoir and utilized to generate power at the Kolbnitz station down in the Möll Valley. At Kolbnitz, water can be released into the river which flows into a reservoir created by the Rottau Dam. This reservoir also serves as the lower reservoir for pumping by the Rottau (Main stage) power plant which is located downstream of Kolbnitz.

Water can also be received and pumped from sources to the north which primarily includes the Grosser Mühldorfer reservoir (Reisseck annual reservoir). The Grosser Mühldorfer also receives water from the Kleiner Mühldorfer, Hochalmsee and Radlsee reservoirs as well. From the Grosser Mühldorfer, water can be released back down to Kolbnitz for power production. Additional water from the Reisseck daily reservoir, about halfway between Grosser and Kolbnitz, can be used as well. This completes the Reisseck scheme of plants which all together have an installed capacity of 138 MW.

In the Malta group, water from the Rottau reservoir down in the Möll River Valley is pumped via the Main stage (Rottau) to the Galgenbichl reservoir below the Kölnbrein. Along the tunneled route, the Gösskar reservoir, and various tributaries provide additional water via pipeline as well. Water storage in the Galgenbichl reservoir is eventually pumped via the Upper storage pumped-storage station into the Kölnbrein reservoir. When generating electricity, water from the upper Kölnbrein reservoir is released about  back down to the Upper stage power plant. The upper stage consists of two reversible Francis turbine generators with a total installed capacity of 120 MW. Water can then be released back through  of pipeline south towards the Möll River Valley.

The Main stage is operated by four Pelton turbines with an installed capacity of 730 MW. Water released from this plant enters Rottau reservoir on the Möll. It is powered by two Kaplan turbine generators with an installed capacity of 120 MW. From the Lower stage, water is discharged into the Drau upstream from the mouth of the Möll. The turbines are up to 92% efficient.

Expansion: Reisseck II
Verbund began constructing the Reisseck II pumped-storage station in 2010, and started testing in 2016. It uses the Grosser Mühldorfer reservoir as an upper reservoir and the Gösskar reservoir as its lower. A  ø7m headrace tunnel from the Grosser Mühldorfer was excavated and connects to the existing headrace tunnel of the Rottau main stage. The power station is located  underground and contains two 215 MW reversible-Francis turbines. It has a total installed capacity of 430 MW and increases the overall capacity of the power plant group by 40%; from 1,026 to 1,459 MW. Cost was €400 million.

Tourism

Verbund also offers tours of the power plant group and the dam. Tours on the dam are conducted daily while the road is open between 9 May and 26 October each year.

In 2010 a "skywalk", a horseshoe-shaped cantilever bridge, was installed on top of the dam for visitors which is also a popular bungee jumping venue. The dam lies within the High Tauern National Park and is a destination for mountaineers as well. Moreover, the reservoir is used by rowers for altitude training.

In popular culture
The dam features in the 1978 film The Boys From Brazil, standing in for a location in Sweden. The movie was shot between late 1977 and early 1978 and shows the newly erected dam with a low reservoir level. In the film the character of the inspector of the local power company (and former SS Major) is thrown off the top of the snow-covered dam by an assassin sent by a fictional Josef Mengele. Various shots around and on top of the dam are shown in the 3 minute 15 second scene at approximately 55 minutes into the film.
The dam also appears in the 2017 Indian film Vivegam in the opening sequence of the film.

References

External links 

Dams completed in 1977
Lakes of Carinthia (state)
Dams in Austria
Arch dams
1977 establishments in Austria
Underground power stations
Pumped-storage hydroelectric power stations in Austria
20th-century architecture in Austria